Lonchegaster is a genus of flies in the family Stratiomyidae.

Distribution
Australia.

Species
Lonchegaster armata White, 1914
Lonchegaster decumbens Hardy, 1933

References

Stratiomyidae
Brachycera genera
Diptera of Australasia
Endemic fauna of Australia